Herschal Hillear Crow, Jr. (March 30, 1935 – July 22, 2015) was an American politician in the state of Oklahoma.

Crow was educated at Oklahoma State University and was a farmer, businessman and former teacher. He was elected to the Oklahoma State Senate in 1968 for the 25th district and served until 1983. From 2001 to 2003, he served as the Oklahoma Secretary of Transportation. He was married with two children. He died after surgery for a broken hip in 2015.

References

1935 births
2015 deaths
People from Altus, Oklahoma
Oklahoma State University alumni
Democratic Party Oklahoma state senators
State cabinet secretaries of Oklahoma